Dramé may refer to:

Alioune Dramé, Guinean economist
Boukary Dramé, Senegalese footballer
Ousmane Dramé, French footballer
Rahmatou Dramé, Malian athlete
Sékou Dramé, Guinean footballer
Tiébilé Dramé, Malian politician